Wired for Sound is a compilation album by Band of Susans, released in 1995 by Blast First.

Track listing

Personnel 
Adapted from Wired for Sound liner notes.
Band of Susans
 Anne Husick – electric guitar
 Mark Lonergan – electric guitar
 Robert Poss – electric guitar, vocals
 Ron Spitzer – drums
 Susan Stenger – bass guitar, vocals

Release history

References

External links 
 

1995 compilation albums
Band of Susans albums
Blast First compilation albums